José de Jesús Mendoza Magaña (born 10 January 1979) is a Mexican former football striker.

Mendoza debuted in the Verano 1997 season with León against Cruz Azul. Mendoza did not receive much playing time until the Invierno 1998 season. For the Invierno 1999 season, Mendoza was transferred to Chivas de Guadalajara. Mendoza played two seasons with Chivas in which he made 33 appearances and scored 10 goals.

When the Invierno 2000 season came, Mendoza was sold to bitter rival Club América. Mendoza won the first championship in his career in the Verano 2002 season with America. Mendoza was sent to Monterrey before the Clausra 2003 season started. Despite playing infrequently during the Clausura 2003, Mendoza won the second championship of his career, this time with Monterrey.

Mendoza was sent back to America for the Apertura 2003 season and has not left since. Mendoza won his third championship during the Clausura 2005 with America. Prior to the Apertura 2005 season, Mendoza was transferred to San Luis F.C.

External links
 
 

1979 births
Living people
Footballers from Mexico City
Mexico under-20 international footballers
Mexico international footballers
Club León footballers
Club América footballers
C.D. Guadalajara footballers
C.F. Monterrey players
Atlante F.C. footballers
San Luis F.C. players
Club Necaxa footballers
Irapuato F.C. footballers
Liga MX players
2000 CONCACAF Gold Cup players
Association football forwards
Mexican footballers
Pan American Games gold medalists for Mexico
Pan American Games medalists in football
Footballers at the 1999 Pan American Games
Medalists at the 1999 Pan American Games